A Piano: The Collection is a five-disc box set spanning the first 15 years of the solo career of American singer and song-writer Tori Amos. Released on September 26, 2006 by Rhino Records as part of the contract Amos negotiated with Warner Music Group, the set includes singles, album tracks, B-sides, rarities, demos, and unreleased songs from album sessions.

Contents
The compilation's first disc is an "extended" version of Amos's 1992 debut, Little Earthquakes. This version has a different song sequence and alternate mixes, as well as four B-sides ("Upside Down" and "Sweet Dreams", and alternate mixes of "Flying Dutchman" and "Take to the Sky") and the previously unreleased, unedited single remix version of "Crucify".

The second disc includes songs from Under the Pink (1994) and Boys for Pele (1996). The tracks consist of original and remixed versions of albums cuts, the B-side "Honey", and a live performance of "Professional Widow". Also included is "Take Me with You" (music recorded in 1990, with lyrics and vocals finished in 2006). The third disc also includes songs associated with Boys for Pele, as well as 1999's To Venus and Back, and one song from 2003's Tales of a Librarian: A Tori Amos Collection.

The fourth disc contains original and remixed versions of songs from From the Choirgirl Hotel (1998), Scarlet's Walk (2002) and The Beekeeper (2005). Also included are the previously unheard intro to "Marys of the Sea" (from The Beekeeper) and four previously unreleased songs: "Not David Bowie" (recorded in 2004 for The Beekeeper), "Ode to My Clothes" (recorded in 2001 in between takes for Strange Little Girls), "Dolphin Song" (recorded in 2003), and "Zero Point" (recorded in 1999 for To Venus and Back), which Amos had mentioned in interviews as well as the liner notes to 1999's To Venus and Back. Amos wrote of "Dolphin Song":

The final disc includes sixteen B-sides from throughout Amos' career to that point, as well as "Merman" (originally a digital download included with pre-orders of From the Choirgirl Hotel, but later included on the 1999 compilation No Boundaries: A Benefit for the Kosovar Refugees), and one previously unreleased song: "Peeping Tommi", recorded in 1993 for Under the Pink. Finally, the disc included a medley of demos for the songs "Fire-Eater’s Wife / Beauty Queen", "Playboy Mommy", and "A Sorta Fairytale". Amos explained:

Track listing

Disc A (440 Hz): Little Earthquakes Extended

Disc B (493.88 Hz): Pink and Pele

Disc C (523.25 Hz): Pele, Venus, and Tales

Disc D (587.33 Hz): Scarlet, Beekeeper, and Choirgirl

Disc E (659.26 Hz): Bonus B-Sides

Errors in the printed track listing

The track listing incorrectly labels "Purple People" as being the B-side version from the "Spark" single, but the version featured here is the live soundcheck version from To Venus and Back.

Likewise, the version of "Take to the Sky" featured here is a different mix from the one released as a B-side to "Winter". The alternate mix on this compilation is noticeably different in that it does not have backing vocals on the second chorus or during the song's outro.

References

Tori Amos albums
B-side compilation albums
2006 compilation albums
Rhino Records compilation albums